Paradize is a 2002 album recorded by French band Indochine. It was its ninth studio album and was released on 14 May 2002. It achieved great success in francophone countries and even topped the albums chart in Belgium (Wallonia). It provided six singles, which became hit singles : "Punker" (#67 in France), "J'ai demandé à la lune" (#1 in France and Belgium, #4 in Switzerland), "Mao Boy" (#18 in France, #20 in Belgium), "Le grand secret" (#9 in France, #35 in Belgium, #37 in Switzerland), "Marilyn" (#22 in France, #25 in Belgium, #71 in Switzerland) and "Un singe en hiver" (#19 in France, #15 in Belgium, #69 in Switzerland). The French edition of Rolling Stone magazine named this album the 98th greatest French rock album (out of 100).

Versions
PARADIZE (CD, Album), Columbia (COL5076362, 5076362000), France (2002)
PARADIZE (CD, Album), Zone 3 (ZCD-1000), Canada (2002)
PARADIZE (Cass), Columbia/Sony Müzik Türkiye (507636-4), Turkey (2002)
PARADIZE (CD, Album), Sony Music (2 507636), Mexico (2003)
PARADIZE (CD, Album, RE), Sony Music (LC00000), France (2012)

Track listing
"Paradize" (Olivier Gérard, Ann Scott, Nicola Sirkis) – 4:49
"Electrastar" (Olivier Gérard, Nicola Sirkis) – 5:30
"Punker" (Nicola Sirkis) – 2:50
"Mao Boy!" (Olivier Gérard, Nicola Sirkis) – 5:42 (music video shot & directed by J.G BIGGS and Peggy M)
"J'ai demandé à la lune" (Mickaël Furnon) – 3:29
"Dunkerque" (Olivier Gérard, Nicola Sirkis) – 5:48
"Like a Monster" (Nicola Sirkis, Jérôme Soligny) – 3:56
"Le grand secret" (with Melissa Auf der Maur - Olivier Gérard, Nicola Sirkis)  – 5:50
"La nuit des fées" (Olivier Gérard, Gérard Manset, Nicola Sirkis) – 4:58
"Marilyn" (Olivier Gérard, Nicola Sirkis) – 5:55
"Le manoir" (Olivier Gérard, Boris Jardel, Nicola Sirkis) – 5:05
"Popstitute" (Marc Eliard, Olivier Gérard, Boris Jardel, Mathieu Rabaté, Nicola Sirkis) – 4:00
"Dark" (Olivier Gérard, Rudy Leonet, Nicola Sirkis) – 4:37
"Comateen" (Olivier Gérard, Camille Laurens, Nicola Sirkis) – 6:07
"Un singe en hiver" (Jean-Louis Murat) – 3:46

Personnel

 Nicola Sirkis : Vocals/Guitar/Keyboards/Synths
 Oli de Sat : Guitar/Keyboards/Synths
 Marc Eliard : Bass/Background vocals
 Boris Jardel : Guitar/Background vocals
 Mathieu Rabaté : Drums
 Background vocals : Marc Morgan
 Engineer : Phil Delire
 Pro-tools : Jean-Paul Gonnod and Phil Delire
 Mixing : Gareth Jones and Phil Delire
 Mastering : George Marino
 Art direction, photo and logo : Peggy M.
 Executive producer : Herve Lauzanne

Charts and sales

Weekly charts

Year-end charts

Certifications

References

External links
 Detailed album information at Indo-chine.org

2002 albums
Indochine (band) albums
Columbia Records albums